The Jonathan Lucas House is a historic house in Charleston, South Carolina.

Jonathan Lucas, Jr., the builder of the house, was born in England and developed milling machines for rice, which led to a boom in rice planting in South Carolina.

In 1893, the home began operating as medical facility called Riverside Infirmary, part of Memorial Hospital. It was also, for time, referred to as the Old Jennings House.

The National Historic Landmark house Hopsewee on the Santee River was also owned by family members, being purchased by John Hume Lucas in 1844.

References

External links

Historic American Buildings Survey including 24 photos and 3 data pages.

National Register of Historic Places in Charleston, South Carolina
Houses on the National Register of Historic Places in South Carolina
Houses in Charleston, South Carolina